Ichthyophonus hoferi is a single-celled protist that occupies a key phylogenetic position to understand the origin of animals. It has chitin cell wall, hyphae, and an amoeboid stage. It is a common parasite of marine and freshwater fishes.

In fish, I. hoferi causes hemorrhages,fin/skin rot, destroys muscle as well as inducing ova to develop without spermatic fertilization through a toxin (Prasad, Aarathi, Like a Virgin, how science is redesigning the rules of sex,  Oneworld Publications, 2012, p.91)

References

External links

Parasitic opisthokonts
Mesomycetozoea
Parasites of fish
Species described in 1911